Vani Vagi Morea (born 13 March 1983) is a former Papua New Guinean cricketer.  Morea is a right-handed batsman who bowls right-arm medium pace.  He was born in Port Moresby.

Morea made his debut for Papua New Guinea in the 2009 World Cricket League Division Three, where he played 5 matches.  He later appeared for Papua New Guinea in the 2011 World Cricket League Division Two.  It was in this competition that he made his List A debut against Bermuda.  He played a further 5 List A matches in the competition, the last coming against Hong Kong.  In his 6 matches in the competition, he scored 165 runs at a batting average of 55.00, with a high score of 74*. This was against Hong Kong. Upon the death of his wife in March 2018 he announced his retirement from cricket to look after his children. His last tour with the Barramundis was to Zimbabwe for the 2018 Cricket World Cup Qualifier where he scored a meager 13 runs in three matches before leaving the tournament early to be there for his wife during her final days.

International career

He made his One Day International debut for Papua New Guinea on 8 November 2014 against Hong Kong in Australia. He made his Twenty20 International debut for Papua New Guinea against Afghanistan in the 2015 ICC World Twenty20 Qualifier tournament on 23 July 2015.

References

External links

1983 births
Living people
People from the National Capital District (Papua New Guinea)
Papua New Guinean cricketers
Papua New Guinea One Day International cricketers
Papua New Guinea Twenty20 International cricketers